The Uskok War, also known as the War of Gradisca, was fought by the Austrians, Croats, and Spanish on one side and the Venetians, Dutch, and English on the other. It is named for the Uskoks, soldiers from Croatia used by the Austrians for irregular warfare.

Since the Uskoks were checked on land and were rarely paid their annual salary, they resorted to piracy. In addition to attacking Turkish ships, they attacked Venetian merchantmen. Although the Venetians tried to protect their shipping with escorts, watchtowers, and other protective measures, the cost became prohibitive: 120,000 thalers annually during the 1590s, 200,000 in the 1600s, and 360,000 by 1615. In December 1615 Venetian troops besieged Gradisca, on the Isonzo River.

The Venetians launched a diplomatic campaign for allies, since the Uskoks were vassals of Archduke Ferdinand of Inner Austria (who was likely to seek help from the Holy Roman Emperor Matthias, his uncle and King Philip III of Spain, his brother-in-law). In September 1616, Count John Ernest of Nassau-Siegen agreed to raise 3,000 men in the Dutch Republic for Venetian service. They arrived in May 1617, followed six months later by another 2,000 with a contingent of English volunteers. Spanish support was blocked at sea by a flotilla of 12 Dutch and 10 English warships, and on land by the war in Mantua.

Beginning
The conflict began in January 1616 in the Gorizia Hills, where a garrison of Uskok and Segnani  supported the Austrian faction. After the Venetian faction gained the advantage in Mariano, they advanced to Gradisca d'Isonzo on 24 February 1616 and camped in Farra.

The Venetian Republic, powerful at sea, was master of the Adriatic; Austria had a small part of the coast of Trieste and Croatia which was blocked by Venice. No vessel could pass this border without paying taxes or having a Venetian residence. In January 1616, the Gorizia Hills (Collio) were guarded by Uskoks and Segnani in Vipulzano and San Martino di Quisco. A Venetian detachment remained in the field of Mariano. Romans and Medeans, camped near Farra, advanced on 24 February 1616 towards Gradisca. The siege lasted for twenty-nine days. The Venetian fleet crashed in Trieste, whose garrison was reinforced by Captain Sebastian Zuech. With 1,000 cavalry and infantry, Benedict Lezze occupied the Venetian castle of San Servolo. Uskok troops led by Vuk Frankopan (Wolfgang Frangipane), the Count of Tržac (Terszatz) and vice-general of Croatia, arrived in Monfalcone on 26 November 1615 and plundered the town.

The Venetian garrison was restricted to the fortress. On the Karst Plateau, near Lokev (Corgnale) in present-day Slovenia, 1,200 Croatian soldiers, 500 horsemen, and 500 Uskoks faced 3,000 Venetians led by Lezze. Although the Duke of Savoy proposed an alliance, the Venetian Senate refused. The administrator of present-day Palmanova mobilized the militias of Savorgnan and Friuli, a total of 3,000 men. The raids began around the Habsburg Gradisca fortress. In the first phase of the war, action in Venice was characterized by mobile offensive forces and the element of surprise. The Archduke abandoned a number of cities (Cervignano, Aquileia, Castelporpetto, Maranutto, Mariano, Romans d'Isonzo, Cormons, and Medea Sagrado), castles, and villages to defend stronger positions. Repulsed, the Uskoks plundered the surrounding villages and the Venetian Loredan administrator received reinforcements to defend the south from their incursions. Poreč (Parenzo) and Rovinj (Rovigno) sent artillery, and Pula sent food and weapons. The armies were concentrated in Svetvinčenat (Sanvincenti), Istria.

Battle of Zaule
With a galley and several smaller ships, Lezze landed in the Muggia valley. Venetians, with six squads guided by Capt. Fabio Gallo, occupied the Zaule salt pan and began to destroy it. Captain Daniel Francol came from the Karst Plateau, followed by Vuk Frankopan, the Count of Tržac, and musketeers under Capt. Sebastian Zuech. The Venetians, caught by surprise, fled to the ships but Lezze blocked his troops' escape. The Venetian galleys opened fire indiscriminately with cannons. Both sides incurred casualties; the Austrians lost voivode Verdonoviz, leader of the Croats, who was killed by cannon fire from a galley.

First Siege of Gradisca

In 1616 the Venetians besieged Farra and Gradisca, and the archduke attacked from Gorizia and Lucinico. With three large culverins, four guns, and three small culverins, Farra (despite damage to its buildings) repulsed the enemy artillery with heavy losses. The Venetians launched another futile assault before Giustiniani lifted the siege and retreated to Mariano.

In September, John Ernest of Nassau-Siegen agreed to raise 3,000 men from the Dutch Republic for Venetian service. They arrived in May 1617, followed six months later by another 2,000 (including a contingent of English volunteers). Spanish support was blocked at sea by a flotilla of 12 Dutch and 10 English warships and on land by the war in Mantua. Although Archduke Ferdinand had only 4,000 soldiers to defend Gradisca, he received military, political, and financial support from the Spanish as part of a larger agreement: Philip agreed to fight the Venetians and support Ferdinand as the next Holy Roman Emperor in return for the cession of Alsace, Finale Ligure, and Piombino. This led to a negotiated settlement between Ferdinand and the Venetians in which many Uskoks were executed or exiled, and a permanent Austrian garrison was installed in Senj.

Battle of Lucinico
Pompeo Giustiniani was flanked by Francesco Ferrante and Martinengo de Rossi. Marcantonio of Manzano, Camillo Trevor's cavalry squadrons and a group of Albanians resumed their raids, killing 60 at the castle of St. Florian and the surrounding area. Adam von Trautmannsdorf received reinforcements, crossed the Isonzo and fortified Lucenico and Gradisca. The Venetians attacked Trautmannsdorf at dawn with three columns from Mariano, Corona, San Lorenzo, and Mossa, led by Orazio Baglioni. The Albanians were in the centre of the Count of Porcia's mercenaries and the cavalry on the right of Francis Camillo Martinengo and Trevor, for a total of 4,000 men. The Albanians occupied the trenches in Lucinico, but instead of advancing they looted the dead soldiers; the other columns incurred heavy losses and were forced to retreat. The Venetians reduced their military activity, and the Austrians received reinforcements.

War in the Alps
Barbarigo was replaced by Antonio Priuli on 2 June. Priuli obtained fresh Friulian and Dalmatian troops, strengthened his field fortifications, and led diversionary raids in Istria. The Austrians responded with raids in Monfalcone. In Monfalconese the Albanian troops faced a strong Venetian attack, sustaining heavy losses.

The war extended into the Alps, and the Venetians plundered Kobarid and Tolmin. Schmit, an English mercenary captain with 400 men hired by the bishop of Bamberg, took Pontebba on 8 August. A counterattack led by Marcantonio of Manzano retook Pontebba and Malborghetto Valbruna five days later. The Austrians, weakened by illness, lost a third of their army and retreated across the Isonzo; the Venetians occupied Lucenico.

Second Siege of Gradisca
Count John Ernest of Nassau-Siegen landed in Monfalcone with 4,000 Dutch mercenaries, increasing the Venetian forces to 20,000 men; English volunteers also arrived. The Venetians prepared for a massive advance on 1 June. Giovanni de Medici moved to Monfalcone, and Giovanni Martinego moved from Mariano through Cassegliano to San Pier d'Isonzo. The right wing of Ferdinand Scotus' cavalry moved from Mariano through Fratta and Monfalcone to Vermegliano, where he was joined by Orazio Baglioni's infantry. The Dutch mercenaries advanced towards the Karst Plateau; brothers Francis and Charles Strassoldo, with 200 armored men, 300 arquebuses, two squadrons of cavalry and one of infantry, took up positions between Farra and Mainizza with large cavalry companies from Cividale del Friuli and Udine.

At dawn on 2 June the Dutch occupied San Martino del Carso, and the Austrians abandoned their positions between Gradisca and the plateau to the Venetians. With a thousand men, Camillo Trevigliano engaged the Austrians in Gorizia. Six galleys attacked Duino Castle.
The following day the Dutch overran Forte Delle Donne (on Monte San Michele), opening a gap
after the arrival of Martinego's artillery; its 42 defenders surrendered. On 5 June, the 400 men at Fort Imperial surrendered to the Dutch in exchange for free passage. The Venetians built several small reduits, placing forty pieces and preparing a final assault on Rubbia (the Austrian headquarters). Although civilians began evacuating Gorizia, on 6 June Henry of Nassau refused to continue the assault due to the fatigue of his men.

The Austrians strengthened their defenses, but during an inspection on 7 June Trautmansdorf was killed by artillery fire. He was succeeded by Baltasar Marradas, who used subterfuge to capture the Venetians. The Austrians repulsed assaults on Rubbia beginning from 9 to 12 June, and the wounded Henry of Nassau brought food to Gradisca.

The Venetians refrained from further offensives, intensifying the blockade of Gradisca; disease halved the Dutch forces. Austrian reinforcements arrived, led by Albrecht von Wallenstein. The Austrians advanced in three columns from Farra, Gradisca, and Gorizia, inflicting heavy losses on Camillo Treviglio's Albanian forces (including commanders Marcantonio Manzano and Leonardo and Pietro Avogadro Gualdo). One column attacked the Venetians blocking Fort Stella, killing Orazio Baglioni and seizing the trenches on Monte San Michele.

Giovanni de Medici left his command for health reasons, and was replaced by Prince Luigi d'Este. Although the Venetians surrounded Fort Stella, Albrecht von Wallenstein brought in reinforcements and supplies. He used his wealth, offering and commanding 200 horses for Archduke Ferdinand of Styria for the war and relieving the fortress of Gradisca from the Venetian siege.

To block Austrian supplies from the valley, the Venetians considered occupying Sdraussina and Fogliano (south of Gradisca). Although the occupation was planned in detail by Don Giovanni de' Medici on 25 August 1617, it was not carried on because it was considered too dangerous and relief to the fort from the plateau continued.

Although Ferdinand had only 4,000 soldiers to defend Gradisca, he received military, political, and financial support from Spain as part of a larger deal: Philip agreed to fight the Venetians and support Ferdinand as the next Holy Roman Emperor in return for the cession of Alsace, Finale Ligure, and Piombino. This led to a negotiated settlement between Ferdinand and the Venetians in which many Uskok pirates were executed or exiled, and a permanent Austrian garrison was installed in Senj.

Peace

In the face of ongoing hostilities, there was a yearning for peace on both sides. In anticipation of problems in Germany, Ferdinand wanted to break away from the commitment of the war with Venice. In any case, Venice was also uncommitted to the war, largely due to fear of direct Spanish intervention.

On 6 November, a truce was signed and on 28 November, demobilisation began. However, peace talks were prolonged and the Netherlands continued to recruit soldiers.

The Treaty of Peace concluded through the mediation of Philip III, Holy Roman Emperor Matthias, Archduke Ferdinand of Austria and the Republic of Venice (now known as the Preliminary Treaty of Paris and the Treaty of Madrid) resolved that pirates would be driven from the maritime areas of the House of Austria. The Venetians returned to their Imperial and Royal Majesty all the places occupied by them in Istria and Friuli.

The Venetians, did, however, achieve the expulsion of Uskoks by Mark and at the same time, the recognition of their sovereignty over the Gulf. Nevertheless, the overall picture was bleak: in the early 1600s, Friuli was in misery, famine, fever, livestock diseases, and incursions of wolves.

References

Thirty Years' War
Wars involving Croatia
Wars involving the Republic of Venice
1610s in Europe
Conflicts in 1615
Conflicts in 1616
Conflicts in 1617
Conflicts in 1618
17th-century military history of Croatia
Venetian period in the history of Croatia
Uskok War
Ferdinand II, Holy Roman Emperor